Caratti is an Italian surname. Notable people with the surname include:

Cristiano Caratti (born 1970), Italian tennis player 
Aaron Caratti (born 1980), Australian race driver 

Italian-language surnames